The Rolling Stones' first concert tour was a "package tour" headlined by the Everly Brothers and Bo Diddley, presented by Don Arden, compered by British comedian Bob Bain. From the Watford date onwards, the Everly Brothers were replaced by Little Richard. The tour commenced on 29 September and concluded on 3 November 1963. They performed two ten-minute shows at every date.

Other acts of the tour were Mickie Most (promoting "Mister Porter"), The Flintstones and Julie Grant ("Up on the Roof", "Count On Me").

Tour musicians
 The Everly Brothers
 Bo Diddley
 Little Richard
 Mickie Most
 Julie Grant
 The Flintstones

The Rolling Stones
 Mick Jagger - lead vocals, harmonica
 Keith Richards - guitar, backing vocals
 Brian Jones - guitar, harmonica, backing vocals
 Bill Wyman - bass guitar, backing vocals
 Charlie Watts - drums, percussion
 Ian Stewart - Piano

Tour set list
Songs performed by the Rolling Stones include:
 "Poison Ivy"
 "Fortune Teller"
 "Come On"
 "Money"
 "Route 66"
 "Roll Over Beethoven"
 "Memphis Tennessee"

Tour dates

See also 
List of The Rolling Stones concert tours

References
 Carr, Roy.  The Rolling Stones: An Illustrated Record.  Harmony Books, 1976.  
 https://www.udiscovermusic.com/stories/rolling-stones-first-tour/

The Everly Brothers concert tours
The Rolling Stones concert tours
1963 concert tours
1963 in the United Kingdom
September 1963 events in the United Kingdom
October 1963 events in the United Kingdom
November 1963 events in the United Kingdom
Concert tours of the United Kingdom